Eupithecia szaboi is a moth in the family Geometridae that is endemic to Thailand.

The forewings are pale brown with a reddish tinge and the hindwings are pale brown.

References

Moths described in 2009
Endemic fauna of Thailand
Moths of Asia
szaboi